Congstar GmbH is a mobile network operator headquartered in Cologne, Germany. The company is a subsidiary of Telekom Deutschland, and specializes in discount mobile phone service marketed to younger people. In August 2014, Congstar's services had approximately 3.4 million users. In December 2019 the brand had over five million customers.

See also
 List of mobile network operators of Europe

References

Companies based in Cologne
Deutsche Telekom
German brands
Mobile phone companies of Germany